Bridgeport School District No. 75 is a public school district in Douglas County, Washington, USA and serves the town of Bridgeport.

As of October 2004, the district has an enrollment of 590 students.

Schools

High schools
 Bridgeport High School
 Bridgeport Aurora High School is a small alternative school with an enrollment of about 20 students in grades 9–12.

Middle schools
 Bridgeport Middle School

Primary schools
 Bridgeport Elementary

See also
 Rural school districts in Washington

External links
Bridgeport School District No. 75
Bridgeport School District Report Card

School districts in Washington (state)
Education in Douglas County, Washington